During the 1999–2000 English football season, Manchester City Football Club competed in the Football League First Division.

Season summary
After gaining promotion to the First Division following a thrilling play-off final against Gillingham, Manchester City won a second successive promotion, coming second in the First Division behind Charlton Athletic, to return to the top flight of English football after a five-year absence.

Team kit
The team kit was produced by Le Coq Sportif and the shirt sponsor was Eidos.

Final league table

Results summary

Results by round

Results
Manchester City's score comes first

Legend

Football League First Division

FA Cup

League Cup

Squad

Left club during season

Reserve squad

References

Manchester City F.C. seasons
Manchester City